The Shreveport Sports were a professional Minor League Baseball team based in Shreveport, Louisiana, in the United States. The Sports fielded a team from 1925 to 1935, 1938 to 1942, 1946 to 1957, and 1959 to 1961. They were affiliated with the Chicago White Sox in 1939, 1942, and 1946.

History
Professional baseball has been played in Shreveport at various levels since 1895, including several teams named the Shreveport Sports :
1925–1932 — Shreveport Sports (Texas League)
1933 — Shreveport Sports (Dixie League)
1934 — Shreveport Sports (East Dixie League)
1935 — Shreveport Sports (West Dixie League)
1938–1942 — Shreveport Sports (Texas League)
1946–1957 — Shreveport Sports (Texas League)

Championships
1942 Texas League championship
1952 Texas League championship 
1955 Texas League championship

Major league alumni
George Sisler (Browns, Braves) (Baseball Hall of Fame inductee)
Zack Wheat (Brooklyn Dodgers, Philadelphia A's) (Baseball Hall of Fame inductee)
Bill Terry (New York Giants) (Baseball Hall of Fame inductee)

Notes

References

Dixie League (1933 baseball) teams
West Dixie League teams
East Dixie League teams
Defunct Southern Association teams
Defunct Texas League teams
Professional baseball teams in Louisiana
Sports
Chicago White Sox minor league affiliates
1925 establishments in Louisiana
1961 disestablishments in Louisiana
Defunct baseball teams in Louisiana
Baseball teams disestablished in 1961
Baseball teams established in 1925